The Plapcea is a right tributary of the river Vedea in Romania. It discharges into the Vedea in Icoana. The following towns and villages are situated along the river Plapcea, from source to mouth: Constantinești, Mogoșești, Jitaru, Potcoava, Fălcoeni, Sinești and Icoana.

References

Rivers of Romania
Rivers of Olt County